In mathematics, a principal bundle is a mathematical object that formalizes some of the essential features of the Cartesian product  of a space  with a group . In the same way as with the Cartesian product, a principal bundle  is equipped with
 A projection onto . For a product space, this is just the projection onto the first factor, .
Likewise, there is not generally a projection onto  generalizing the projection onto the second factor,  that exists for the Cartesian product. They may also have a complicated topology that prevents them from being realized as a product space even if a number of arbitrary choices are made to try to define such a structure by defining it on smaller pieces of the space.

A common example of a principal bundle is the frame bundle  of a vector bundle , which consists of all ordered bases of the vector space attached to each point.  The group  in this case, is the general linear group, which acts on the right in the usual way: by changes of basis.  Since there is no natural way to choose an ordered basis of a vector space, a frame bundle lacks a canonical choice of identity cross-section.

Principal bundles have important applications in topology and differential geometry and mathematical gauge theory. They have also found application in physics where they form part of the foundational framework of physical gauge theories.

Formal definition

In particular each fiber of the bundle is homeomorphic to the group  itself. Frequently, one requires the base space  to be Hausdorff and possibly paracompact.

Because the action is free and transitive, the fibers have the structure of G-torsors. A -torsor is a space that is homeomorphic to  but lacks a group structure since there is no preferred choice of an identity element.

An equivalent definition of a principal -bundle is as a -bundle  with fiber  where the structure group acts on the fiber by left multiplication. The fibers of  then become right -torsors for this action.

The definitions above are for arbitrary topological spaces. One can also define principal -bundles in the category of smooth manifolds. Here  is required to be a smooth map between smooth manifolds,  is required to be a Lie group, and the corresponding action on  should be smooth.

Examples

Trivial bundle and sections 
For example, if , the Lie group of  unitary matrices, then a section can be constructed by considering four real-valued functionsand applying them to the parameterization

Other examples 

Here the fiber over a point  is the set of all frames (i.e. ordered bases) for the tangent space . The general linear group  acts freely and transitively on these frames.
 Variations on the above example include the orthonormal frame bundle of a Riemannian manifold. Here the frames are required to be orthonormal with respect to the metric. The structure group is the orthogonal group .
 A normal (regular) covering space  is a principal bundle where the structure group
 
 acts on the fibres of  via the monodromy action.
 Let  be a Lie group and let  be a closed subgroup (not necessarily normal). Then  is a principal -bundle over the (left) coset space .
This principal -bundle is the associated bundle of the Möbius strip.
 Projective spaces provide some more interesting examples of principal bundles. Recall that the -sphere  is a two-fold covering space of real projective space . We then have a series of principal bundles for each positive :
 
 
 
For all of these examples the  cases give the so-called Hopf bundles.

Basic properties

Trivializations and cross sections

One of the most important questions regarding any fiber bundle is whether or not it is trivial, i.e. isomorphic to a product bundle. For principal bundles there is a convenient characterization of triviality:

Proposition. A principal bundle is trivial if and only if it admits a global section.

The same is not true for other fiber bundles. For instance, vector bundles always have a zero section whether they are trivial or not and sphere bundles may admit many global sections without being trivial.

The same fact applies to local trivializations of principal bundles. Let  be a principal -bundle. Given a local trivialization

one can define an associated local section 

Conversely, given a section  one defines a trivialization  by

The simple transitivity of the  action  on the fibers of  guarantees that this map is a bijection, it is also a homeomorphism. The local trivializations defined by local sections are -equivariant in the following sense. If we write

in the form 

then the map

satisfies

Equivariant trivializations therefore preserve the -torsor structure of the fibers. In terms of the associated local section  the map  is given by

The local version of the cross section theorem then states that the equivariant local trivializations of a principal bundle are in one-to-one correspondence with local sections.

On overlaps these must be related by the action of the structure group . In fact, the relationship is provided by the transition functions

By gluing the local trivializations together using these transition functions, one may reconstruct the original principal bundle. This is an example of the fiber bundle construction theorem.
For any  we have

Characterization of smooth principal bundles

If  is a smooth principal -bundle then  acts freely and properly on  so that the orbit space  is diffeomorphic to the base space . It turns out that these properties completely characterize smooth principal bundles. That is, if  is a smooth manifold,  a Lie group and  a smooth, free, and proper right action then
 is a smooth manifold,
the natural projection  is a smooth submersion, and

Use of the notion

Reduction of the structure group

Given a subgroup H of G one may consider the  bundle  whose fibers are homeomorphic to the coset space . The reason for this name is that the (fiberwise) inverse image of the values of this section form a subbundle of  that is a principal -bundle. If  is the identity, then a section of  itself is a reduction of the structure group to the identity. Reductions of the structure group do not in general exist.

For example:

 An -dimensional real manifold admits a -plane field if the frame bundle can be reduced to the structure group .
 A manifold is orientable if and only if its frame bundle can be reduced to the special orthogonal group, .

Also note: an -dimensional manifold admits  vector fields that are linearly independent at each point if and only if its frame bundle admits a global section. In this case, the manifold is called parallelizable.

Associated vector bundles and frames

This is the sense in which principal bundles provide an abstract formulation of the theory of frame bundles.

Classification of principal bundles

The classifying space has the property that any  principal bundle over a paracompact manifold B is isomorphic to a pullback of the principal bundle . In fact, more is true, as the set of isomorphism classes of principal  bundles over the base  identifies with the set of homotopy classes of maps .

See also
Associated bundle
Vector bundle
G-structure
Reduction of the structure group
Gauge theory
Connection (principal bundle)
G-fibration

References

Sources

 
 
 
 
 

Differential geometry
Fiber bundles
Group actions (mathematics)